Mount Tobin is the highest mountain in the Tobin Range of Pershing County in Nevada, United States. It is the second-most topographically prominent peak in Pershing County and ranks twelfth among the most topographically prominent peaks in Nevada. The peak is on public land administered by the Bureau of Land Management and thus has no access restrictions, though private property is located along the most popular route to the summit.

References 

Tobin